West Melton Aerodrome  is a small airport located in West Melton, Canterbury, New Zealand. West Melton Aerodrome is located just 6 nautical miles west of Christchurch International Airport. It is owned and operated by the Canterbury Aero Club.

References

External links
 Canterbury Aero Club

Airports in New Zealand
Transport in Canterbury, New Zealand
Transport buildings and structures in Canterbury, New Zealand